Troy Michael Halpin (born 17 August 1973) is an Australian footballer and Sports/Football Development coach at Barker College and St Pius X Chatswood.

Career
He is one of the great talents Australian football has produced in the last two decades and was one of the most skillful players plying their trade in the now-defunct National Soccer League. Halpin represented many NSL clubs and won the NSL championship with Sydney Olympic and Perth Glory. He also played with Newcastle United and at Perth Glory with his brother Scott Halpin. He has also played with Sydney United and Marconi in the NSW competition and wore the No 10 shirt. Halpin was most famous for his outstanding technical ability with the ball and vision in the mid-field. He was capped 12 times, and scored 3 goals, for the Socceroos. This was seen by many as a waste as he is rated as on of Australia's finest footballing talents.

Coaching career
He was previously employed by the Kings School in a role as Director of Football. Halpin then held the role of player/coach in the Northern NSW NBN State Football League with the Toronto Awaba Stags FC before moving to Edgeworth Eagles FC where he continued playing whilst also overseeing youth development for the club in the 2010 season. Halpin was also previously on the coaching staff at Mongo Football which is a Football Academy on Sydney's North Shore and is based at Macquarie University. Currently, Halpin is a Sports/Football Coaching co-ordinator at Barker College and St Pius X Chatswood.

References

External links
Oz Football stats

1973 births
Living people
Australian soccer players
Australia international soccer players
National Soccer League (Australia) players
Perth Glory FC players
Sydney Olympic FC players
Sydney United 58 FC players
Expatriate footballers in Malaysia
Australian expatriate sportspeople in Malaysia
Wollongong Wolves FC players
Australian expatriate soccer players
Sportspeople from Newcastle, New South Wales
Association football midfielders
Stirling Macedonia FC players
Newcastle Breakers FC players
1998 OFC Nations Cup players